HSOB may refer to one of many things:

El Obeid Airport, in Sudan, has the ICAO code HSOB
High School Old Boys the name of many sporting and alumni organisations, among them:
Cardiff HSOB RFC, a Welsh rugby union club
Christchurch High School Old Boys, a New Zealand football club
Douglas High School Old Boys A.F.C., a Manx football club
Dunedin High School Old Boys, a defunct New Zealand football club
High School Old Boys RFC, a New Zealand rugby union club
Invercargill High School Old Boys, a defunct New Zealand football club
Melbourne High School Old Boys Association, an Australian sporting and alumni organisation
Napier High School Old Boys, a defunct New Zealand football club
Newport HSOB RFC, a Welsh rugby union club